Sims House may refer to:

Phillips-Sims House, Hogansville, Georgia, listed on the NRHP in Georgia
George R. Sims House, Palmetto, Georgia, listed on the NRHP in Georgia
Sims-Brown House, Columbus, Mississippi, listed on the NRHP in Mississippi
Sims House (Jackson, Mississippi), listed on the NRHP in Mississippi
Sims-Garfield Ranch, Ryegate, Montana, listed on the NRHP in Montana
Capt. William Sims House, Greenfield, Tennessee, listed on the NRHP in Tennessee
Wilkinson-Martin House, Pulaski, Tennessee, also known as Sims House, listed on the NRHP in Tennessee
John Green Sims House, Wartrace, Tennessee, listed on the NRHP in Tennessee
Sims House (Orange, Texas), listed on the NRHP in Texas
O. B. Sims House, Waxahachie, Texas, listed on the NRHP in Ellis County, Texas